Good Times A’ Comin’ is the second album by British rock band Hookfoot.

Track listing

Personnel
Caleb Quaye – lead vocals, guitar, keyboards
Dave Glover – bass guitar
Roger Pope – drums, percussion, vocals
Ian Duck – harmonica, vocals, guitar
Bob Kulick – guitar, vocals on track 1

Production
Produced by Jeff Titmus and Caleb Quaye
Engineered by Jeff Titmus and Terry Carty
Michael Ross - sleeve design
Ed Caraeff - photography

References
All information from liner notes from Good Times A’ Comin’ (Copyright © 1972 DJM Records and A&M Records), Inc. 4338)
Allmusic 
Artist Direct

1972 albums
A&M Records albums
DJM Records albums